Oscar Héctor Camilión (6 January 1930 – 12 February 2016) was an Argentine lawyer and diplomat.

Born in 1930, he earned a law degree at the University of Buenos Aires in his hometown. Camilión first joined the Ministry of Foreign Affairs and Worship as chief of staff under the administration of Arturo Frondizi. Camilión then worked for Clarín from 1965 to 1972. After the 1976 Argentine coup d'état, Camilión was appointed the ambassador to Brazil by Jorge Rafael Videla. Videla's successor Roberto Eduardo Viola then selected Camilión to lead the Ministry of Foreign Affairs and Worship. Viola was ousted in another coup, and Camilión became a representative of the United Nations Secretary General. He also served as Minister of Defense from 1993 to 1996 under Carlos Menem.

Camilión died in Buenos Aires in 2016, aged 86.

References

1930 births
2016 deaths
Politicians from Buenos Aires
University of Buenos Aires alumni
Academic staff of the University of Buenos Aires
Ambassadors of Argentina to Brazil
Foreign ministers of Argentina
20th-century Argentine lawyers
Defense ministers of Argentina
Argentine politicians convicted of corruption